Els Mertens (born 14 August 1966) is a former Belgian racing cyclist. She finished in third place in the Belgian National Road Race Championships in 1987 and 1989.

References

External links
 

1966 births
Living people
Belgian female cyclists
People from Brecht, Belgium
Cyclists from Antwerp Province